Ravar (also Romanized as Rāvar) is a city and capital of Ravar County, Kerman Province, Iran. Ravar is the national carpet city of Iran.  At the 2006 census, its population was 22,910, in 5,921 families.  Ravar produces a distinctive type of Kerman carpet. Ravar is also well known for its vast pistachio fields.

References

Populated places in Ravar County
Cities in Kerman Province